"Shoeshine Boy" is a 1975 R&B/pop single by Eddie Kendricks. The single was the last of his three number-one U.S. R&B hits and one of his final crossover singles, peaking at number eighteen on the Billboard Hot 100.

References

1975 singles
Eddie Kendricks songs
1975 songs